Yair Nossovsky (born 29 June 1937) is an Israeli former international footballer who competed at the 1970 FIFA World Cup, having previously played for the Israeli national team during the 1966 World Cup qualifying campaign.

Nossovsky played in two official games for the Israeli national side.

References

1937 births
Living people
Israeli footballers
Israel international footballers
Hapoel Kfar Saba F.C. players
1970 FIFA World Cup players
Association football goalkeepers